Nomad with Carlton McCoy is an American travel and food reality television series. The series stars master sommelier and CEO of Heitz Cellar Carlton McCoy seeking authentic culture and off-the-beaten-path finds in various destinations around the world. The series began airing on May 1, 2022, on CNN.

Episodes

Production
In May 2021, Nomad with Carlton McCoy from Zero Point Zero Production was announced as part of CNN's then upcoming slate. It was revealed in a press release at the beginning of 2022 that it would premiere that year. It was originally planned for a March release before being moved to May.

References

External links
 
 Nomad with Carlton McCoy at CNN
 Nomad with Carlton McCoy at CNN Creative Marketing

2020s American reality television series
2022 American television series debuts
CNN original programming
Food travelogue television series